David the Dendrite (c. 450–540), also known as David the tree-dweller and David of Thessalonika, is a patron saint of Thessaloniki. David became a monk at the Monastery of Saints Merkourios and Theodore outside Thessaloniki. Famed for his sound advice, he was  hounded by crowds seeking words of wisdom and prayer. Wishing a quiet, contemplative life, David fled to the seclusion of an almond tree, where he lived for three years. 

He left the tree to petition the Byzantine emperor Justinian the Great in Constantinople to send soldiers to defend Thessaloniki from attack. David died in 540 as his ship was en route to Macedonia.

David is commemorated on June 26 (by the Catholic Church and the Eastern Orthodox Church).

See also
Church of Hosios David

Notes

References

Further reading
Velimirovic, Nicholas. The Prologue from Ochrid, vol. 2. Birmingham: Lazarica Press, 1986

External links
God's Foolishness, a discussion of holy fools, including David the Dendrite

540 deaths
6th-century Christian saints
Byzantine Thessalonians
Greek hermits
Greek Christian monks
Saints of medieval Macedonia
Saints of medieval Greece
Year of birth unknown
Year of birth uncertain